Us is the sixth studio album by the English singer-songwriter and musician Peter Gabriel, released on 28 September 1992 by Real World Records. Following the release of his soundtrack album Passion in 1989, Gabriel started work on new material for a new album, his first since So, which became his biggest selling release. Gabriel focused on personal themes on Us, including his divorce in the late 1980s, his subsequent relationship with actress Rosanna Arquette, and the growing distance between him and his first daughter.

Us was promoted with an early form of interactive multimedia software for Macintosh computers entitled Xplora1: Peter Gabriel's Secret World, which featured several music videos from the album. The album was a worldwide chart success, reaching No. 2 in the UK and the US and the top-ten in twelve other countries. Four singles were released: "Digging in the Dirt", "Steam", "Blood of Eden", and "Kiss That Frog", with "Steam" reaching No. 10 in the UK. Gabriel supported the album with his Secret World Tour in 1993 and 1994 which was documented on the Secret World Live album and same-titled concert film, both released in 1994. Us was reissued in 2002 and 2010.

Background
In October 1989, Gabriel first worked on prototypes of songs which would end up on the Us album, but he was also preparing new versions of songs for the 1990 compilation album Shaking the Tree: Sixteen Golden Greats, and he was supervising the editing of 1987 concert footage shot in Greece, which was released in 1990 as the live video album POV. Finally, through 1991 and into June 1992 he focused on composing and recording the Us album, mainly at his own Real World Studios in Wiltshire, England, with specialised recording sessions held at Kingsway Studios in New Orleans, and Studio 2000 in Dakar.

Gabriel had met Sinéad O'Connor in October 1990 at the Amnesty International human rights benefit concert held in Santiago, Chile. Gabriel tapped O'Connor to sing on his album, and she came to Real World Studios to perform her vocal parts on "Blood of Eden" and "Come Talk to Me", the latter written by Gabriel to his younger daughter, Melanie – a teenager. Daniel Lanois co-produced the album with Gabriel, with support from David Bottrill in programming and engineering. Lanois and Bottrill were given the task of organising and mixing tracks from approximately one thousand Digital Audio Tapes (DAT) containing various studio performances. The final album ended up being almost 58 minutes long, substantially longer than his earlier releases which held to the 46-minute limit of the analog 12-inch vinyl LP.

Track listing

Personnel

Musicians

Peter Gabriel – vocals (all tracks), keyboards (all tracks), triangle (track 1), programming (tracks 1, 2, 7–10), synth bass (tracks 1, 3, 7, 9, 10), percussion (tracks 2, 4, 9), valiha (track 2), horn arrangement (track 4), harmonica (track 9), Mexican flute (track 10) 
Tony Levin – bass guitar (tracks 1–7 and 10) 
David Rhodes – guitar (tracks 1, 2, 4, 5, 7–10), twelve-string guitar (track 3), solo guitar (track 4) 
Manu Katché – drums (tracks 1, 6, 7), electric drums (tracks 2, 4, 5, 10), percussion (track 10) 
The Babacar Faye Drummers – sabar drums (tracks 1 and 4) 
Doudou N'Diaye Rose – programming (tracks 1 and 10) 
David Bottrill – programming (tracks 1–4, 7, 10), additional programming (tracks 5 and 9), studio engineer
Chris Ormston – bagpipes (track 1) 
Daniel Lanois – shaker (track 1), guitar (tracks 1, 10), additional vocals (track 1), hi-hat (track 3), vocals (track 3), horn arrangements (track 4), Dobro (tracks 8, 10) 
Richard Blair – additional verse keyboards (track 1), programming (tracks 4, 5, 7, 9), additional programming (tracks 2, 3) 
Levon Minassian –  duduk (tracks 1, 3, 8) 
Sinéad O'Connor – vocals (tracks 1, 3) 
Dmitri Pokrovsky Ensemble – vocals (track 1) 
Hossam Ramzy – tabla (track 2), surdo (track 7) 
Daryl Johnson – drums (track 2) 
William Orbit – programming (track 2), additional programming (track 5) 
Bill Dillon – guitar (tracks 2, 5) 
Mark Rivera – alto saxophone (tracks 4, 6) 
Brian Eno – additional keyboards (track 2) 
L. Shankar – violin (tracks 2, 3, 5, 8) 
Caroline Lavelle – cello (tracks 2, 6, 10), string arrangement (track 2) 
Wil Malone – string arrangement (track 2, 6) 
Jonny Dollar – string arrangement (track 2, 6) 
Richard Evans – additional engineering (track 2), mix engineer (track 8), mandolin (track 8) 
Gus Isidore – bridge guitar (track 3) 
Richard Chappell – bridge section mix (track 3) 
Leo Nocentelli – guitar (tracks 4, 7) 
Tim Green – tenor saxophone (tracks 4, 6) 
Reggie Houston – baritone saxophone (tracks 4, 6) 
Renard Poché – trombone (tracks 4, 6) 
Wayne Jackson – trumpet (track 4), cornet (track 6) 
Kudsi Erguner – ney flute (track 5), shaker (track 4) 
Ayub Ogada – vocals (track 5, 7) 
Malcolm Burn – horn arrangement (track 6), additional synth cello (track 10), additional production ideas (track 10) 
Mark Howard – horns recording (track 6) 
Babacar Faye – djembe (tracks 7, 8) 
Assane Thiam – tama (track 7), talking drum (track 8) 
Peter Hammill – vocals (track 7) 
Richard Macphail – vocals (track 7) 
John Paul Jones – surdo (track 8), bass (track 8), keyboards (track 8)
Adzido Pan African Dance Ensemble – additional percussion loop (track 9) 
Manny Elias – Senegalese shakers (track 9) 
Marilyn McFarlane – vocals (track 9)

Technical support
Mike Large
Sue Coulson
Brian Gray

Charts

Weekly charts

Year-end charts

Certifications and sales

References

External links

Peter Gabriel albums
Real World Records albums
Albums produced by Daniel Lanois
Albums produced by Peter Gabriel
1992 albums
Geffen Records albums
Worldbeat albums